Eleazer Hart House is a historic home located at 243 Bronxville Road in the Cedar Knolls section of Southeast Yonkers, Westchester County, New York. It was built in 1788 and is a Federal period residence.  The building incorporates an earlier tenant farmhouse dating from the Philipse Manor era (1684–1783) and most likely dates to about 1760.  The older house is a -story, three-by-two-bay building on a stone foundation. The main house is five bays wide on the first floor and three bays on the second.  It has a gable roof and is clad in wide shingles, painted white. Also on the property is a -story, gable-roofed barn.

It was added to the National Register of Historic Places in 1982.

References

Houses on the National Register of Historic Places in New York (state)
Federal architecture in New York (state)
Houses completed in 1783
Buildings and structures in Yonkers, New York
Houses in Westchester County, New York
National Register of Historic Places in Yonkers, New York